Packer Township is a township in Carbon County, Pennsylvania. It is part of Northeastern Pennsylvania. The population was 998 at the 2010 census.

Geography
The township is in the western part of Carbon County and is bounded by Schuylkill County on the west. It is in the Delaware River watershed and is drained by Quakake Creek, a tributary of the Lehigh River, except for a portion in the southwest that is drained by the Schuylkill River via Still Creek and the Little Schuylkill River. Its villages include Gerhards, Hudsondale, and Stewarts.

Packer has a warm-summer humid continental climate (Dfb) and the hardiness zones are 5b and 6a. Average monthly temperatures in Hudsondale range from 24.9 °F in January to 69.7 °F in July.

Neighboring municipalities
Banks Township (north)
Weatherly (northeast)
Lehigh Township (east)
Nesquehoning (south)
Rush Township, Schuylkill County (southwest)
Kline Township, Schuylkill County (west)

Demographics

As of the census of 2000, there were 986 people, 372 households, and 274 families residing in the township.  The population density was 34.2 people per square mile (13.2/km).  There were 407 housing units at an average density of 14.1/sq mi (5.5/km).  The racial makeup of the township was 98.17% White, 0.10% Native American, 0.20% Asian, 0.20% from other races, and 1.32% from two or more races. Hispanic or Latino of any race were 0.10% of the population.

There were 372 households. Of the households surveyed, 32.0% had children under the age of 18 living with them, 64.0% were married couples living together, 6.7% had a female householder with no husband present, and 26.1% were non-families. 21.8% of all households were made up of individuals, and 9.9% had someone living alone who was 65 years of age or older.  The average household size was 2.62 and the average family size was 3.08.

In the township, the population was spread out, with 23.9% under the age of 18, 4.7% from 18 to 24, 29.7% from 25 to 44, 24.1% from 45 to 64, and 17.5% who were 65 years of age or older.  The median age was 41 years. For every 100 females, there were 98.4 males.  For every 100 females age 18 and over, there were 100.0 males.

The median income for a household in the township was $39,038, and the median income for a family was $43,250. Males had a median income of $31,111 versus $21,181 for females. The per capita income for the township was $17,038.  About 3.3% of families and 7.2% of the population were below the poverty line, including 1.7% of those under age 18 and 12.7% of those age 65 or over.

Transportation

Pennsylvania Route 93 is the only numbered highway passing through Packer Township. It follows a northwest-southeast alignment through the northeastern portion of the township, crossing Quakake Creek in Hudsondale and leading northwest across Spring Mountain  to Hazleton and southeast across Broad Mountain  to Jim Thorpe, the Carbon County seat.

References

Populated places established in 1790
Townships in Carbon County, Pennsylvania
Townships in Pennsylvania